Ursinae is a subfamily of Ursidae (bears) named by Swainson (1835). It was assigned to Ursidae by Bjork (1970), Hunt (1998) and Jin et al. (2007).

Classification

The genera Melursus and Helarctos are sometimes also included in Ursus. The Asiatic black bear and the polar bear used to be placed in their own genera, Selenarctos and Thalarctos; these are now placed at subgenus rank.

 Subfamily Ursinae Fischer de Waldheim, 1817
  Helarctos Horsfield, 1825
 Helarctos malayanus (Raffles, 1821) – sun bear
  Melursus Meyer, 1793
Melursus ursinus (Shaw, 1791) – sloth bear
  Ursus Linnaeus, 1758
 Ursus americanus (Pallas, 1780) – American black bear
 Ursus arctos Linnaeus, 1758 – brown bear
 †Ursus boeckhi Schlosser, 1899
 †Ursus deningeri Richenau, 1904
 †Ursus etruscus Cuvier, 1823
 †Ursus ingressus Rabeder, Hofreiter, Nagel & Withalm 2004
 †Ursus kudarensis Baryshnikov, 1985
 Ursus maritimus Phipps, 1774 – polar bear
 †Ursus minimus (Devèze & Bouillet, 1827)
 †Ursus rossicus Borissiak, 1930
 †Ursus spelaeus Rosenmüller, 1794 – cave bear
 †Ursus theobaldi Lydekker, 1884
 Ursus thibetanus (Cuvier, 1823) – Asiatic black bear
 †Ursus yinanensis Li, 1993
 †Protarctos Kretzoi, 1945
 †Protarctos abstrusus (Bjork, 1970)
 † Aurorarctos Jiangzuo & Flynn, 2020
 † Aurorarctos tirawa (Jiangzuo & Flynn, 2020)

A number of hybrids have been bred between American black, brown, and polar bears (see Ursid hybrids).

References

Bears